Johannes Heinrich Ursinus (also known as Johannes Henricus Ursinus, Iohannes Henricus Ursinus, Johann Heinrich Ursin and even John Henry Ursinus)  (26 January 1608 in Speyer – 14 May 1667 in Regensburg) was a learned German author, scholar, Lutheran theologian, humanist and dean of Regensburg. 

Ursinus studied the Oriental roots of western philosophy and was the author of a scholastic encyclopaedia. He was a Rector in Mainz, preached in Weingarten, Speier and Regensburg, and had been a student in Straßburg.

His Arboretum Biblicum, which appeared in 1663, was the first attempt of note to create a concordance of botanical references in the Bible, and predated the Hierozoicon, a zoological compendium of biblical animals, of Samuel Bochart. In all Ursinus published 137 works in 153 publications in 3 languages.

The plant genus Ursinia was named after Ursinus by the German botanist, Joseph Gaertner.

Selected works
 Musagetes, seu de studiis recte instituendis consilium, Regensburg 1656, Nürnberg 1659, Leipzig 1678
 Atrium Latinitatis sive Commentarius locuples in Januam Comenianam, Frankfurt 1657
 Progymnastices oratoriae epitome, praxin grammaticam, dialecticam, rhetoricam, Nürnberg 1659
 Analecta rhetorica sive progymnasmata sacrae profanaeque eloquentiae libri II, Nürnberg 1660
 De Zoroastre Bactriano, Hermete Trismegisto, Sanchoniathone Phoenicio eorumque scriptis et aliis contra Mosaicae scripturae antiquitatem exercitationes familiares, Nürnberg 1661
 Tyrocinium historico-chronologicum sive in Historiam Sacram et Profanam Universalem Brevis Manuductio in Usum Iuventutis, Frankfurt 1662 online
 Epitome metaphysicae, Nürnberg 1664
 Compendium Topicae generalis, Nürnberg 1664
 Compendium Logicae Aristotelicae, Regensburg 1664
 Encyclopaedia scholastica sive artium, quas vocant liberalium prima rudimenta, Nürnberg 1665
 De fortuna, Christophorus Ursinus ad panegyrin solemnem qua Johannes Brunnemannus viro Christiano Wildvogeln publ. collaturus, humanitate invitat, Frankfurt 1668

Bibliography
 Johannes Henricus Ursinus, Autobiographischer Lebenslauf, Regensburg 1666; Neudr. von H. W. Wurster (Hg.), in: Zeitschrift für bayerische Kirchengeschichte 51, Nürnberg. 1982, S. 73 – 105.

References

German scholars
1608 births
1667 deaths